Crane County is a county located in the U.S. state of Texas. As of the 2020 census, its population was 4,675. The county seat is Crane. The county was created in 1887 and later organized in 1927. It was named for William Carey Crane, a president of Southern Baptist-affiliated Baylor University in Waco, Texas.

History

Native Americans

Indigenous peoples were the first inhabitants of the area. Later Indian tribes included Comanches, Lipan Apache, and Kiowa.

County establishment and growth

Crane County was formed in 1887 from Tom Green County, and named after William Carey Crane, former president of Baylor University.  Settlement came years later, and the county was not organized until 1927. In 1900, the United States census enumerated only 51 people and 12 ranches in the county. As late as 1918, the county had no roads.

Church and Fields Exploration Company obtained a permit late in 1925 to drill for oil. The first well came in March 1926.

By 1927, an estimated 6,000 people were in the county, with 4,500 of them within the city of Crane. Water was trucked in and brought from $1.00 to $2.25 a barrel, though at times the rates could be as high as $5.00 a barrel.  A barrel of drinking water would typically last a month if used judiciously, and barrels of nonpotable water were available for cleaning and washing purposes.  Crane City was incorporated in the early 1930s, and with that came state funds for the building of a city water system. 
At the same time, the Texas Rangers were working to clean up oil towns, and the population in Crane began to include more families.  As such, numerous raids by law enforcement closed the red light district centered on Alford Street. 
By the beginning of 1991, almost  of oil had been produced in the county since discovery in 1926.

County history is preserved in the Museum of the Desert Southwest, which opened in Crane in 1980.

Geography

Major highways
  U.S. Highway 385
  State Highway 329

Adjacent counties
 Ector County (north)
 Upton County (east)
 Crockett County (south)
 Pecos County (south)
 Ward County (west)

Demographics

Note: the US Census treats Hispanic/Latino as an ethnic category. This table excludes Latinos from the racial categories and assigns them to a separate category. Hispanics/Latinos can be of any race.

As of the census of 2000, 3,996 people, 1,360 households, and 1,082 families resided in the county.  The population density was five people per square mile (2/km2).  The 1,596 housing units averaged two per square mile (1/km2).  The racial makeup of the county was 73.70% White, 2.90% Black or African American, 0.98% Native American, 0.35%, 19.49% from other races, and 2.58% from two or more races. About 43.87% of the population were Hispanic/Latino of any race.

Of the 1,360 households, 43.40% had children under the age of 18 living with them, 67.80% were married couples living together, 7.90% had a female householder with no husband present, and 20.40% were not families. About 18.80% of all households were made up of individuals, and 9.50% had someone living alone who was 65 years of age or older.  The average household size was 2.91, and the average family size was 3.35.

In the county, the population was distributed as 31.90% under the age of 18, 7.70% from 18 to 24, 26.90% from 25 to 44, 22.60% from 45 to 64, and 10.90% who were 65 years of age or older.  The median age was 34 years. For every 100 females, there were 94.80 males.  For every 100 females age 18 and over, there were 90.50 males.

The median income for a household in the county was $32,194, and for a family was $36,820. Males had a median income of $33,438 versus $16,806 for females. The per capita income for the county was $15,374.  About 12.40% of families and 13.40% of the population were below the poverty line, including 15.30% of those under age 18 and 10.50% of those age 65 or over.

Economy

The largest segment of the local economy is oil and gas production. The Waddell Ranch contains the single biggest portion of the Permian Basin Royalty Trust, with over 800 producing oil wells as of 2007.

Communities
 Crane (county seat)

Education
All of the county is in the Crane Independent School District.

All of the county is in the service area of Odessa College.

Politics
Crane County has been dominated by the Republican Party since 1972.

See also

 Recorded Texas Historic Landmarks in Crane County

References

External links
 Crane County Government Website
 
 Entry for William Carey Crane from the Biographical Encyclopedia of Texas published 1880, hosted by the Portal to Texas History.
 Inventory of county records, Crane County courthouse, Crane, Texas, hosted by the Portal to Texas History

 
1927 establishments in Texas
Populated places established in 1927
Majority-minority counties in Texas